Hunslet and Riverside is an electoral ward of Leeds City Council in Leeds, West Yorkshire, largely covering the inner city area of Hunslet to the south of the city centre. It was created in advance of the 2018 council election.

Prior to the 2018 election, the predecessor ward most closely corresponding to Hunslet and Riverside was City and Hunslet ward, containing Leeds city centre since 2004. From 1980 to 2022, the councillors in these wards all belonged to the Labour Party. In May 2022, however, the ward elected a councillor from the Green Party; the same election saw a similar departure in the neighbouring ward of Middleton Park, which elected a councillor from the Social Democratic Party.

Councillors since 1973 

 indicates seat up for re-election.
 indicates councillor defection or change in party affiliation.
* indicates current incumbent councillor.

Elections since 2018

May 2022

May 2021

May 2019

May 2018

Elections from 2004 to 2017 (City and Hunslet)

May 2016

May 2015

May 2014

May 2012

May 2011

May 2010

May 2008

May 2007

May 2006

May 2004

Elections from 1980 to 2003 (Hunslet)

2003
Election results in this section are as published by the Elections Centre.

2002

|- style="background-color:#F6F6F6"
! style="background-color: " |
| colspan="2"   | Labour gain from Independent Socialist
| align="right" | Swing
| align="right" | +3.8
|-

2000

1999

1998

1996

1995

1994

1992

1991

1990

1988

1987

1986

1984

1983

1982

1980

Elections from 1973 to 1980 (Hunslet East & West)

1979

1978

1976

|- style="background-color:#F9F9F9"
! style="background-color: " |
| British National
| S. Brown
| align="right" | 50
| align="right" | 0.8
| align="right" | +0.8
|-

1975

1973

Notes

References

Wards of Leeds